Al-Baraman is a sub-district located in Az Zahir District, Al Bayda Governorate, Yemen.  Al-Baraman had a population of 5230 according to the 2004 census.

References 

Sub-districts in Az Zahir District